Abigail Leigh Spencer (born August 4, 1981) is an American actress. She began her career playing Rebecca Tyree on the ABC daytime television soap opera All My Children (1999–2001) before going on to star in the Lifetime crime drama series, Angela's Eyes (2006). She also had recurring roles on Mad Men (2009), Hawthorne (2009-2011), Suits (2011–2019), and Grey's Anatomy (2017–2022). From 2013 to 2016, Spencer starred as Amantha Holden in the SundanceTV drama series Rectify, for which she received a nomination for a Critics' Choice Television Award. From 2016 to 2018, Spencer starred as history professor Lucy Preston in the NBC science-fiction series Timeless. Spencer has appeared in numerous films, such as In My Sleep (2010), Cowboys & Aliens (2011), This Means War (2012), Chasing Mavericks (2012), The Haunting in Connecticut 2: Ghosts of Georgia (2013), Oz the Great and Powerful (2013), and This Is Where I Leave You (2014).

Early life
Spencer was born and raised in Gulf Breeze, Santa Rosa County, Florida, the daughter of Lydia Ann Brown and surfer Yancy Spencer III (1950-2011). She has two brothers, Yancy Spencer IV (born  1973) and Sterling Spencer (born  1986). Spencer has claimed that she is part Cherokee.

Career
Spencer's first major acting role was playing Rebecca "Becca" Tyree on ABC soap opera All My Children from June 3, 1999, to April 10, 2001. She later starred in Lifetime Television original series Angela's Eyes, which was cancelled on December 1, 2006. In the following years, she began playing guest roles on several television series, including CSI: Crime Scene Investigation, How I Met Your Mother, Private Practice and Castle.

Spencer played the role of a blogging enthusiast in Twix advertisements, and portrayed Miss Farrell, a love interest of Don Draper, on AMC's Mad Men in 2009. In early 2011, she landed the lead role on ABC drama pilot Grace by Krista Vernoff. Spencer had previously played the title character in another Krista Vernoff drama pilot, Introducing Lennie Rose, in 2005. Spencer appeared in a recurring role as Dr. Erin Jameson on the TNT series Hawthorne in 2010, and since 2011 has had a recurring role as Dana "Scottie" Scott, Gabriel Macht's character's old rival, on the USA Network legal drama Suits.

Spencer has appeared in several films, including In My Sleep (2010), Cowboys & Aliens (2011), This Means War (2012), and Chasing Mavericks (2012), and she played the lead role in The Haunting in Connecticut 2: Ghosts of Georgia (2013).  She appeared in fantasy adventure film Oz the Great and Powerful, directed by Sam Raimi, in 2013.

Spencer received critical acclaim for starring as Amantha Holden in the Sundance Channel original drama series Rectify (2013–2017). She was nominated for Critics' Choice Television Award for Best Supporting Actress in a Drama Series and Satellite Award for Best Actress – Television Series Drama for her performance in the series.

Spencer played the lead role in the indie drama A Beautiful Now, written by Daniela Amavia, about a passionate dancer who finds herself considering an extreme act when she reaches a crossroads in her life. She was nominated for a Madrid International Film Festival Award for Best Actress for her performance in film. In 2014, Spencer appeared opposite Jason Bateman in the comedy-drama film This Is Where I Leave You, an ensemble comedy directed by Shawn Levy, and  starred with John Travolta and Christopher Plummer in the crime thriller film The Forger.

In October 2014, Spencer joined the cast of the second season of HBO crime drama series,  True Detective.

In 2016, Spencer was cast as lead character Lucy Preston in the NBC series Timeless,<ref>{{cite web|url=http://tvline.com/2016/02/17/abigail-spencer-time-travel-nbc-cast-shawn-ryan-eric-kripke/|title= Rectify'''s Abigail Spencer to Star in NBC's Time Travel Drama Pilot From Eric Kripke and Shawn Ryan|author=Michael Ausiello|work=TVLine|access-date=10 December 2019}}</ref> where she plays a history professor sent on time travel missions to different eras in an effort to prevent others from disrupting the U.S.-related timestream. A review of the series in Variety called Spencer "prodigiously talented" and that she played "a character whose major personality traits are 'smart' and 'plucky.'" A review by Deadline Hollywood said that the show was a waste of Spencer's talents. The New York Times wrote that "Abigail Spencer is good as Lucy, the spunky historian who is the show's central character." Timeless was renewed by NBC on May 12, 2017. The network had canceled the series days earlier, but reversed the decision. The series ended after two seasons.

Spencer and Duke Johnson's production company, Innerlight Films, has produced award-winning short films such as Here and Now, and the 2015 Oscar short-listed Winter Light. The company has also produced the upcoming  film The Actor, based on Donald E. Westlake's novel Memory, starring André Holland and Gemma Chan.

Personal life
Spencer married Andrew Pruett in 2004 and gave birth to their son, Roman Pruett, in 2008. They filed for divorce in February 2012, divorcing in 2013.

Spencer first met actress Meghan Markle at an audition and the two later became co-stars on Suits. She contributed to Markle's former blog, The Tig''. She was one of the guests at Markle’s wedding to Prince Harry at St George's Chapel, Windsor Castle on May 19, 2018, and she also attended Markle's baby shower in February 2019.

Filmography

Film

Television

References

External links

 

1981 births
20th-century American actresses
21st-century American actresses
Actresses from Florida
American film actresses
American soap opera actresses
American television actresses
Anti-bullying activists
Living people
People from Gulf Breeze, Florida
American people who self-identify as being of Native American descent